The Great Storm of 1854 occurred in and around the Black Sea on 14 November 1854. It caused severe damage and caused major disruption to armed forces—naval forces especially—in the region engaged in the Crimean War.

At the time of the storm, the British and allied supply fleet was in the Black Sea with all of the supplies for the winter campaign.  A strong gale blew up and began battering the fleet. Eyewitness accounts record the flattening of tents and uprooting of trees, and at least 37 ships were either severely damaged or wrecked. Most of the winter supplies were lost, including food, fuel, and winter uniforms. As a result, many men died from hypothermia and disease.

The storm caused a series of scandals. Funds raised to help the troops disappeared, much of it into the pockets of officers. It was also discovered that the storm had been tracked across Europe prior to its arrival off Crimea, but no warning was sent. As a result of this latter occurrence, several countries quickly launched independent meteorological services. In France, Urbain Le Verrier, director of the Observatoire de Paris, was commanded to set up a storm warning system; this later developed into an international meteorological service.

Though it is impossible to precisely calculate the strength or speed of the wind, estimates have placed it around force 11 on the Beaufort Scale.

See also
List of shipwrecks in November 1854#14 November

Footnotes

Sources 

 
 

1854 in Europe
1854 meteorology
1854 natural disasters
Crimean War
November 1854 events
Storms